Naata is a 1955 Indian Hindi-language social film directed by Deena Nath Madhok and starring Madhubala, Abhi Bhattacharya and Chanchal.

The film was produced under the banner of Madhubala's production company Madhubala Private Ltd., which she had set up in 1955. Upon its release, Naata received mixed reviews from critics and failed at the box office.

Plot 
Naata was the story of a traumatized girl who relates the romance between her sister and a new post-master.

Cast 

 Madhubala as Tara
 Abhi Bhattacharya as Bade Babu
 Chanchal as Beena
 Gope as Shravan Kumar
 Moolchand as Harmonium Player in Qawwali
 Kanhaiyalal as Lakhibaba
 Vijayalakshmi as Seeta

Soundtrack 
The soundtrack of Naata was composed by S. Mohinder, with lyrics being penned by Tanveer Naqvi. As reported by Cinestaan, Madhubala wanted Lata Mangeshkar to lend her voice to the songs of the film, but Mangeshkar was uninterested and refused. It was then Naqvi's wife who convinced Mangeshkar to sing for Naata. The film's songs proved to be very popular among the audience.

Reception

Critical reception 
Upon its initial release in 1955, Naata was not well-received by critics. A Thought review written by V. S. M. found the screenplay to be "poor" and the direction, "poorer". However, he praised the cinematography extensively and stated it to be of high standards. The performances of Madhubala and Chanchal were lauded, but Abhi Bhattacharya's expressions were called "wooden".

Box office 
Naata was released during the time Madhubala's films were not scoring well at the box-office. Her recent releases had been Amar (1954), Bahut Din Huwe (1954), Naqab (1955) and Mr. & Mrs. '55 (1955), of which only the latter was a commercial success.

Apparently Naata too underperformed at the box-office. The colossal failure of the film largely affected Madhubala financially and she was compelled to mortgage a huge bungalow belonging to her to recover the loss.

References

External links 

Indian drama films
1950s Hindi-language films
1955 films
1955 drama films
Indian black-and-white films